Hayles Abbey Halt railway station is a halt opened by the Great Western Railway on the Honeybourne Line from  to Cheltenham which served the hamlet of Hailes in Gloucestershire, as well as the nearby Hailes Abbey, between 1928 and 1960. The line through the site of the station was reinstated in 1985 and opened in 1987 by the Gloucestershire Warwickshire Railway, although for many years no new halt was provided. The halt was eventually reopened on 5 June 2017 after being rebuilt by volunteers. Unlike the original, however, it only has a single platform. It lies between Toddington and Winchcombe stations.

History 
The OW&W became the West Midland Railway in 1860 and was acquired by Great Western Railway in 1883 with a view to combining it with the Birmingham to Stratford Line to create a high-speed route from the Midlands to the South West. The GWR obtained authorisation in 1899 for the construction of a double-track line between Honeybourne and Cheltenham and this was completed in stages by 1908.

Hayles Abbey Halt was opened on 24 September 1928. Situated  from Honeybourne East Loop, the station consisted of two facing platforms constructed of sleepers, on each of which was a small corrugated iron passenger waiting shelter. Footpaths from the adjacent road led to the platforms which were lit by oil lamps maintained by porters at  whose stationmaster had overall responsibility for the station.

The provision of the halt coincided with the opening of a museum at nearby Hailes Abbey, a ruined Cistercian abbey founded in 1246 by Richard of Cornwall. The Sunday offering consisted of two services from Honeybourne to Cheltenham and back. Nearly 30 years later, the final timetable for Hayles Abbey Halt showed the same service pattern, the only difference being an additional service to Honeybourne on weekdays. The station closed on 7 March 1960, the same day on which the local passenger service was withdrawn from the Honeybourne Line.

Present day
The Gloucestershire Warwickshire Railway (GWSR) have reopened the line through Hayles Abbey Halt, with the first services between Toddington and Winchcombe running on 2 August 1987. It is just a half mile from Hailes Abbey itself, protected by English Heritage.

Although a new halt was planned on the site in 1998, this did not materialise. In March 2015, it was reported that the board of the GWSR had authorised the reconstruction of the station to a design to match the original. However, unlike the original, only a single two-coach platform will be provided on the Cotswolds side of the line. In June 2016, it was confirmed that a corrugated iron shelter, recovered from Usk and similar to the one originally at Hayles Abbey Station, would be erected.

By January 2017, work was finally underway on the reconstruction of Hayles Abbey Halt, which has a single platform. The halt finally reopened as a request stop on 5 June 2017. There are no parking facilities at the station.

References

Sources

 
 
 

 

Railway stations in Great Britain opened in 1928
Railway stations in Great Britain closed in 1960
Disused railway stations in Gloucestershire
Former Great Western Railway stations
Heritage railway stations in Gloucestershire
Stanway, Gloucestershire